Pentanchidae is a family of sharks belonging to the order Carcharhiniformes.

Genera:
 Apristurus Garman, 1913
 Asymbolus Whitley, 1939
 Cephalurus Bigelow & Schroeder, 1941
 Galeus Rafinesque, 1810
 Halaelurus Gill, 1862
 Holohalaelurus Fowler, 1934
 Parmaturus Garman, 1906
 Pentanchus Smith & Radcliffe in Smith, 1912

References

Carcharhiniformes
Shark genera